Faraján is a town and municipality in the province of Málaga, part of the autonomous community of Andalusia in southern Spain. The municipality is situated approximately 25 kilometers from Ronda and 144 km from the city of Málaga. It is located west of Málaga in the Genal valley. It is one of the towns that make up the comarca of the Serranía de Ronda.

It has a population of approximately 300 residents. The natives are called Farajeños or Celestotes.

References

Municipalities in the Province of Málaga